Australian Left Review was a monthly journal of the Communist Party of Australia (CPA) from 1966 to 1993. It was one of a number of left political journals founded in Australia in the post-war years, including Overland and Arena (first series).

History and profile
Australian Left Review was the successor to the earlier CPA journal Communist Review, which published between 1934 and 1966. The headquarters of the journal was in Sydney. The journal was also published on a bi-monthly basis. In 1992, the publication briefly changed its name to ALR Magazine before ceasing publication altogether.

References

External links
Australian Left Review's listing at Reason in Revolt
Online issues of Australian Left Review (1966-93)

1966 establishments in Australia
1993 disestablishments in Australia
Bi-monthly magazines published in Australia
Communist magazines
Defunct political magazines published in Australia
Magazines established in 1966
Magazines disestablished in 1993
Magazines published in Sydney
Monthly magazines published in Australia